Valentín Otondo (born 20 August 1999) is an Argentine professional footballer who plays as a central midfielder for Brown.

Career
Otondo started his career with Sarmiento de Pigüé, prior to moving to Olimpo in 2017. He was an unused substitute twice for the club during the 2017–18 season in the Primera División, for fixtures with Atlético Tucumán and Talleres in May 2018 as they were relegated. Before making his Primera B Nacional bow against Ferro Carril Oeste in September, Otondo made two appearances in the Copa Argentina in July versus Aldosivi and Gimnasia y Esgrima respectively. Ahead of 2019–20, following Olimpo's relegation to Torneo Federal A, Otondo departed for Brown on 14 August 2019.

In February 2020, Otondo joined Huracán Ingeniero White. In March 2022, he signed with Liniers Bahía Blanca.

Career statistics
.

References

External links

1999 births
Living people
Sportspeople from Buenos Aires Province
Argentine footballers
Association football midfielders
Primera Nacional players
Olimpo footballers
Club Atlético Brown footballers
Liniers de Bahía Blanca players
21st-century Argentine people